Restaldi is a surname. Notable people with the surname include:

Ari Renaldi, Indonesian music producer, composer, arranger, sound and mixing engineer, music director and musician
Francesco Renaldi (1755–1798 or later), English-born painter
Gerald Renaldi, 16th-century Irish Roman Catholic archdeacon
Richard Renaldi (born 1968), American portrait photographer